Anatoliy Ivanovych Volobuyev (born June 16, 1953) is a former Ukrainian football player, and a head-coach of couple Ukrainian teams in the Premier and First leagues.

Coaching career

In his career Volobuyev was involved with FC Stal Alchevsk since 1988. Before spending a season as manager of FC Zorya Luhansk in the Ukrainian Premier League Volobuyev held the position of Vice-President of the Professional Football League of Ukraine.

He was hired back as head coach of Stal Alchevsk in November 2009.

References

External links
 Profile at Zorya web-site 

1953 births
Living people
People from Alchevsk
Soviet footballers
FC Shakhtar Pavlohrad players
FC Shakhtar Stakhanov players
NK Veres Rivne players
FC Komunarets Komunarsk players
Ukrainian football managers
FC Stal Alchevsk managers
FC Zorya Luhansk managers
Ukrainian Premier League managers
Association footballers not categorized by position
Sportspeople from Luhansk Oblast